Mardi Gras Records is a New Orleans music label that wholesales and distributes the New Orleans music genre. Mardi Gras Records specializes in the rich musical heritage of Louisiana since 1977. The company was founded in 1977 by Warren Hildebrand. Mardi Gras Records started off as retail stores but now has been branched into the record label known today.

External links
Mardi Gras Records at Discogs

American record labels
Record labels based in Louisiana